Gholam-Hossein Mohseni-Eje'i (born 29 September 1956) is an Iranian conservative politician, Islamic jurist and prosecutor who currently serves as Chief Justice of Iran.

He was the minister of intelligence from 2005 to July 2009, when he was abruptly dismissed. He has also held a number of governmental posts since 1984.

Early life and education
Gholam Hossein Mohseni-Eje'i was born in Ezhiyeh, Isfahan, Imperial State of Iran in 1956. He is a graduate of the Haqqani school in Qom and one of his teachers was Mesbah Yazdi. He also received a master's degree in international law from the Haqqani school.

Career
Mohseni-Eje'i served as Head of the Ministry of Intelligence's Select Committee from 1984 to 1985. He was then Representative of the Head of Judiciary to the Ministry of Intelligence (1986–88). From 1989 to 1990, he served as Head of the Prosecutor's Office for economic affairs. Next, he held the post of Representative of the Head of Judiciary to the Ministry of Intelligence, from 1991 to 1994. His next post was Prosecutor of the Special Clerical Court, which he held from 1995 to 1997. He was appointed Minister of Intelligence on 24 August 2005 after securing 217 votes in his favor at the Majlis. He was in office until 26 July 2009, when he was abruptly dismissed. No reason was given for his dismissal, but it was thought to be connected to his opposition to the appointment of Esfandiar Rahim Mashaei as first vice-president. As a spokesman for the judiciary, he has also been accountable to the media and journalists.

Prosecutor general 
Shortly after his dismissal, on 24 August 2009, he was appointed Prosecutor general of Iran by the Head of Judiciary, Ayatollah Sadeq Larijani, replacing Ghorbanali Dorri-Najafabadi.

Special Clergy Court 
In 1998, with the ruling of Seyyed Ali Khamenei, ⁣ he succeeded Mohammad Reyshahri, who held the position of Attorney General of the Special Clerical Court. He has also been the Special Prosecutor for the Clergy for two years.

One notable incident during his tenure at Special Clergy court is having a fight with Eisa Saharkhiz and biting him.

Scientific records 
Mohseni Ejei has a teaching background in the Baqer al-Uloom College of the Ministry of Intelligence, teaching in the educational department of the Revolutionary Courts, as well as the Faculty of Judicial Sciences.

Activities and views
On 15 July 2009, Mohseni-Eje'i told reporters that his ministry might publicize confessions made by people held for weeks without access to their lawyers. He said, "The confessions obtained from those arrested could be made public, should the Judiciary decide to air their remarks." Human rights activists raised concerns that "these so-called confessions are obtained under duress."

After his dismissal, president Mahmoud Ahmadinejad praised Mohsen-Eje'i as a good human being, but said his removal was necessary as the ministry needed huge changes to cope with the situation. He further said if the ministry had done its job properly, there would not have been post-election bloody riots in which some people died, but he stopped short of criticizing Mohseni-Eje'i as responsible for them.

According to Stratfor, Mohseni-Eje'i is a conservative hardliner affiliated with hardline cleric Mohammad Yazdi.

Mohsen-Eje'i has indicated he would welcome alternative punishments to the death penalty for some drug traffickers, if these alternatives proposed by teachers were more effective punishments than the death penalty. However, he stated that, so far, critics of the death penalty in Iran have not offered alternatives that would deal effectively with Iran's drug gangs.

Sanctions
Mohseni-Eje'i was among several Iranian officials that were sanctioned in 2011 by the United States Department of State and the European Union for his role in suppressing the 2009 Iranian presidential election protests.

See also
Chain murders of Iran

References

External links 

 18 of Iran’s 21 new ministers hail from Revolutionary Guards, secret police  with a photograph of Mohseni-Eje'i
 Mohseni Ezhei: From Inquisitor to Minister of Information

1956 births
Chief justices of Iran
Living people
Iranian prosecutors
Shia Islamists
Qadis
Iranian Shia clerics
Ministers of Intelligence of Iran
Islamic Republican Party politicians
Directors of intelligence agencies
21st-century Iranian politicians